A crabeater is an animal species that feeds on crabs. It may refer to:

 Cobia, a species of fish which also is commonly called crabeater
 Crabeater seal, a species of seal
 Crabeater gull, also known as Olrog's gull
 Crab-eating fox, a canid species
 Crab-eating raccoon, a raccoon species
 Crab-eating mongoose, a mongoose species
 Crab-plover, a shorebird species
 Crab-eating frog, a frog species
 Fordonia leucobalia, also known as crab-eating water snake
 Crab-eating macaque, a simian species

Animal common name disambiguation pages